In commercial law, a holder in due course (HDC) is someone who takes a negotiable instrument in a value-for-value exchange without reason to doubt that the instrument will be paid. If the instrument is later found not to be payable as written, a holder in due course can enforce payment by the person who originated it and all previous holders, regardless of any competing claims those parties may have against each other. This right shields a holder in due course from the risk of taking instruments without full knowledge of their history.

Rights 

The rights of a holder in due course of a negotiable instrument are qualitatively, as matters of law, superior to those provided by ordinary species of contracts:
 The rights to payment are not subject to set-off, and do not rely on the validity of the underlying contract giving rise to the debt (for example if a cheque was drawn for payment for goods delivered but defective, the drawer is still liable on the cheque).
 No notice need be given to any party liable on the instrument for transfer of the rights under the instrument by negotiation. However, payment by the party liable to the person previously entitled to enforce the instrument "counts" as payment on the note until adequate notice has been received by the liable party that a different party is to receive payments.
 Transfer free of equities—the holder in due course can hold better title than the party he obtains it from (as in the instance of negotiation of the instrument from a mere holder to a holder in due course)
 Negotiation often enables the transferee to become the party to the contract through a contract assignment (provided for explicitly or by operation of law) and to enforce the contract in the transferee-assignee’s own name. Negotiation can be affected by endorsement and delivery (order instruments), or by delivery alone (bearer instruments). In addition, the rights and obligations accruing to the transferee can be affected by the rule of derivative title, which does not allow a property owner to transfer rights in a piece of property greater than his own.

Limitations 
The rule can be considered inequitable to consumers. As a response to this, the U.S. Federal Trade Commission promulgated Rule 433, formally known as the "Trade Regulation Rule Concerning Preservation of Consumers' Claims and Defenses", which "effectively abolished the [holder in due course] doctrine in consumer credit transactions". In 2012, the FTC reaffirmed the regulation.

References

Negotiable instrument law